This list of research methods in biology is an index to articles about research methodologies used in various branches of biology.

Research design and analysis

Research designs

Charts and diagrams

Statistical analyses

Laboratory techniques

Field techniques

Computational tools

Mathematical models

Algorithms

References

External links

Biology
Biology